Mohicans was a 19th-century football club that played football by the rugby football codes. It is notable for being one of the twenty-one founding members of the Rugby Football Union.

History
Mohicans was established in 1869 with about fifty members. It fielded two teams of twenty a side for rugby matches. The derivation of the club's name appears to have been lost in the midsts of time. The teams' colours were chocolate and magenta.

On 26 January 1871, they sent representation to a meeting of twenty-one London and suburban football clubs that followed Rugby School rules (Wasps were invited by failed to attend) assembled at the Pall Mall Restaurant in Cockspur Street. E.C. Holmes, captain of the Richmond Club assumed the presidency. It was resolved unanimously that the formation of a Rugby Football Society was desirable and thus the Rugby Football Union was formed. A president, a secretary and treasurer, and a committee of thirteen were elected, to whom was entrusted the drawing-up of the laws of the game upon the basis of the code in use at Rugby School. Although Mohicans was considered prominent enough to have been invited, they did not gain any of the thirteen places on the original committee.

The club played its football at the Battenham Road, Lower Edmonton. In 1873 the club relocated to Coleraine Park, Tottenham and whilst there they changed at the Red Lion pub in Tottenham.

Disbandment
The club disbanded in 1874 after just five seasons.

Notable players
Despite their apparent prominence, the club produced no international players.

References

English rugby union teams
Rugby clubs established in 1869
Rugby union clubs in London
Defunct English rugby union teams
1869 establishments in England